When the Roses Bloom in Dixieland: Their Complete Victor Recordings (1929–1930) is a compilation of recordings made by American country music group the Carter Family, released in 1995. It is the third of nine compilations released by Rounder Records of the group's Victor recordings. The original Carter Family group consisting of Alvin Pleasant "A.P." Delaney Carter, his wife Sara Dougherty Carter, and his sister-in-law Maybelle Addington Carter recorded many of what would become their signature songs for Victor Records.

History 
Maybelle Carter began using a Gibson L-5 f-hole guitar in place of the smaller Stella she previously used, allowing her guitar more prominence. Her innovative guitar technique is today widely known as the "Carter scratch" or "Carter style" of picking (see Carter Family picking).

In the early 1930s, A. P. Carter befriended Lesley "Esley" Riddle, a black guitar player from Kingsport, Tennessee. Esley accompanied A.P. on his song-collecting trips. Many songs, such as "Motherless Children" and "Wabash Cannonball" found here, were traditional folk songs that were copyrighted by A. P.

The tracks have all been digitally remastered and include liner notes by country music historian Charles K. Wolfe.

Reception 
In his No Depression review, critic Kels Koch stated, "What counts 65 years later is that these recordings — as crucial a patch in American music’s tapestry as any — are back in print to entertain and console yet another generation: ours." Larry Stephens (Country Standard Time) notes or the recordings "The uninitiated should not expect the polished sound of most of today's music, although technicians did a great job removing the hiss and scratchiness of the original recordings."

Track listing 
All songs are credited to A. P. Carter.
 "Motherless Children" – 3:35  
 "When the Roses Bloom in Dixieland" – 3:27  
 "No Telephone in Heaven" – 3:15  
 "The Western Hobo" – 2:54  
 "Carter's Blues" – 2:56  
 "Wabash Cannonball" – 2:55  
 "A Distant Land to Roam" – 2:57  
 "Jimmie Brown, the Newsboy" – 2:33  
 "Kitty Waltz" – 3:04  
 "Fond Affection" – 3:22  
 "The Cannonball" – 2:57  
 "Lover's Farewell" – 3:01  
 "There's Someone Awaiting for Me" – 3:07  
 "Little Log Hut in the Lane" – 2:50  
 "When the Springtime Comes Again" – 2:44  
 "When the World's on Fire" – 3:08

Personnel 
A. P. Carter – vocals
Maybelle Carter – vocals, guitar, autoharp
Sara Carter – vocals, autoharp
Production notes:
Ralph Peer – producer
Dr. Toby Mountain – mastering
Scott Billington – design, photography
Charles K. Wolfe – liner notes

References

External links 
The Carter Family: A Comprehensive Discography

Carter Family albums
1995 compilation albums
Rounder Records compilation albums